The Definitive Pop Collection may refer to:

 The Definitive Pop Collection (Sonny & Cher album), 2006 
 The Definitive Pop Collection (The Manhattan Transfer album), 2006